Loar is a surname. Notable people with the surname include:

Edward Loar (born 1977), American golfer
Lloyd Loar (1886–1943), American mandolin designer

References

English-language surnames
Scottish surnames
German-language surnames